The Aloha 30 is a Canadian sailboat, that was designed by Ron Holland and first built in 1986.

Production
The boat was built by Ouyang Boat Works under the Aloha Yachts brand in Canada between 1986 and 1989, but it is now out of production.

Design

The Aloha 30 is a small recreational keelboat, built predominantly of fiberglass, with wood trim. It has a fractional sloop rig, a/an internally-mounted spade-type rudder and a fixed fin keel. It displaces  and carries  of ballast.

The boat is fitted with a Westerbeke or Volvo diesel engine.

The boat has a PHRF racing average handicap of 147 with a high of 156 and low of 141.

Operational history
In a review Michael McGoldrick wrote, "The Aloha 30 is a good example of the new breed of boat which started to emerge from the Canadian sailboat industry in the latter half of the 1980s. These boats were heavily influenced by the French designs which quickly became popular in North America, and they tend to include the mandatory aft cabin. The Aloha 30 was designed by Ron Holland, who became known for coming up with very fast boats, and this 30 footer was a bit of a departure for a manufacturer usually identified with building solid cruising boats. The Aloha 30 has a factional rig, a feature that makes it easier to control the shape of the rather large mainsail. It also has an deep elliptical shaped fin keel, which was all the rage for fast designs in the late 1980s and early 1990s."

See also
List of sailing boat types

Similar sailboats
Alberg 30
Alberg Odyssey 30
Annie 30
Bahama 30
Bristol 29.9
C&C 30
C&C 30 Redwing
C&C Mega 30 One Design
Catalina 30
Catalina 309
CS 30
Grampian 30
Hunter 30
Hunter 30T
Hunter 30-2
Hunter 306
J/30
Leigh 30
Mirage 30
Nonsuch 30
O'Day 30
Odyssey 30
Pearson 303
S2 9.2
Santana 30/30
Seafarer 30
Southern Cross 28

References

External links

Keelboats
1980s sailboat type designs
Sailing yachts
Sailboat type designs by Ron Holland
Sailboat types built by Ouyang Boat Works